Eldorado is an unincorporated community in Tift County, in the U.S. state of Georgia.

History
A variant name was "Fender". A post office called Fender was established in 1898, and remained in operation until 1959. The present name is derived from Spanish meaning "golden one".

References

Unincorporated communities in Tift County, Georgia